A number of ships of the French Navy have borne the name Jeanne d'Arc, in honour of Joan of Arc. They include the following ships:
 , a 52-gun frigate (1820–1834) built in Brest. She was the flagship of the Caribbean squadron.
 , a 42-gun frigate (1837–1865), commissioned in 1852. She took part in the Crimean War. Renamed Prudente in 1865, decommissioned in 1898
 , an armoured corvette (1867–1885) built in Cherbourg
 , a cruiser built in 1901
 , a light cruiser built in 1930
 , a helicopter cruiser

Since 1912, it has been a tradition of the French Navy that the main school ship for officers be named Jeanne d'Arc.

Jeanne d'Arc